El Brij, is a village of Tunisia, at latitude 36°48'13.44" and Longitude 10°36'8.95"  on the Cape Bon peninsula  near the village of Sidi Rais and Korbous. Surrounded by the Qorbus Forest and with access to beaches for the residents of Carthage, the area has been popular as a health resort since Roman times. 
It is part of Nabeul Governorate.

  El Brij has a mosque with a tall square minaret.

See also
Kerkouane
Sidi Rais
Korbous
Cap Bon

References

Roman towns and cities in Tunisia
Archaeological sites in Tunisia
Ancient Berber cities
Populated places in Tunisia